Răcătău may refer to several entities in Romania:

 Răcătău, a village in Blandiana Commune, Alba County
Măguri-Răcătău, a commune in Cluj County
 Răcătău-Răzeși and Răcătău de Jos, villages in Horgești Commune, Bacău County
Răcătău (Siret), a tributary of the Siret in Bacău County
Răcătău (Someș), a tributary of the Someșul Rece in Cluj County